Ames Hitchens Chicken Farm was a historic home and farm located near Millsboro, Sussex County, Delaware. It included a two-story, wood frame, gable front dwelling and two long, one-story, flatroofed buildings, used as chicken houses. It was the last of these structures still standing within the Indian River Nanticoke community.

It was added to the National Register of Historic Places in 1979. It is listed on the Delaware Cultural and Historic Resources GIS system as destroyed or demolished.

References

Farms on the National Register of Historic Places in Delaware
Houses in Sussex County, Delaware
Nanticoke tribe
National Register of Historic Places in Sussex County, Delaware